The Division of Dobell is an Australian electoral division in the state of New South Wales.

The current MP is Emma McBride, a member of the Australian Labor Party. She has served since 2016.

History

The Division of Dobell was created in 1984 and is named in honour of Sir William Dobell, the painter. Dobell was originally a fairly safe seat for the Australian Labor Party, but grew increasingly marginal from 1996 onward. The seat was ultimately won by the Liberal Party in the 2001 election. The Liberals consolidated their hold on the seat at the 2004 election; however Labor regained the seat at the 2007 election when Craig Thomson defeated Ken Ticehurst.

Its most prominent members have been Michael Lee, a former minister in the Keating government and later Councillor for the City of Sydney, who held the seat for Labor between 1984 and 2001; and Craig Thomson.

Thomson, a former union official, was elected to represent Labor in 2007 and gained notoriety when, as part of the Health Services Union expenses affair, it was alleged there was improper use of Thomson's union-issued corporate credit card. In April 2012, Thomson sought suspension from the Labor Party and sat on the crossbench as an independent member of the House of Representatives. Thomson stood as an independent candidate at the subsequent 2013 Federal Election and received 4% of the vote. After leaving parliament, Thomson was found guilty of fraud.

A redistribution prior to the 2016 federal election saw Dobell change from a marginal Liberal seat in to a notional marginal Labor seat with a notional Labor two-party margin of 0.2 percent. Incumbent Liberal member Karen McNamara re-contested the seat, but was defeated by Labor candidate Emma McBride, the daughter of former state MP Grant McBride, on a swing of four percent.

Boundaries
Since 1984, federal electoral division boundaries in Australia have been determined at redistributions by a redistribution committee appointed by the Australian Electoral Commission. Redistributions occur for the boundaries of divisions in a particular state, and they occur every seven years, or sooner if a state's representation entitlement changes or when divisions of a state are malapportioned.

The division is located in the Central Coast region and includes the suburbs of The Entrance, Tuggerah and Wyong. The electorate stretches from Blue Haven in the north to Wyoming in the south, from The Entrance in the East through the Jilliby Valley. The division includes the suburbs Bateau Bay, Berkeley Vale, Blue Haven, The Entrance, Gorokan, Jilliby, Lisarow, Ourimbah, Toukley, Tuggerah, Tumbi Umbi, Wamberal, Wyoming, and Wyong.

Members

Election results

References

External links
 Division of Dobell - Australian Electoral Commission

Electoral divisions of Australia
Constituencies established in 1984
1984 establishments in Australia
Central Coast (New South Wales)